Al-Iqtisād fī al-iʿtiqad, or The Moderation in Belief is a major theological work by Abū Ḥāmid Muḥammad ibn Muḥammad al-Ghazali. George Hourani indicated that the Iqtisad and Mizan al-amal were completed before or during
Ghazali's crisis of faith. It led him his post at the Niẓamiyya school in Baghdad and enter the path of Tasawwuf. In it, he offers what scholars consider as the best defence of the Ash'arite school of Islamic theology. He also expressed strong reservations about a theology based on taqlid and marked by polemics. In this book, Ghazali makes an attempt to respond to the extreme literalists and the Muʿtazilites. It is the balance between reason and revelation that led to the title of book The Moderation in Belief.

Contents 
Ghazali begins the book with praise for God and importance of revelation. On one hand, he says,
a person who is not guided by reason will misunderstand the revelation while on the
other hand a rationalist may exceed the limits leading to rejection of the plain meaning of
revelation. The right course, he says, is to reconcile reason with revelation, one that puts reason at the service of understanding and then interprets the revelation. Reason, together
with the Revelation, is light upon light as mentioned in Quran chapter 24, verse 35.
Next comes an explanatory chapter with its four introductions and four main sections. Ghazali's
main topic throughout is in praise of God, depicting it as a work of theology.

Translations 
A translation into English of the first sections was published as a dissertation by Dennis Morgan Davis Jr. in 2005.

The first complete English-language edition of was made by Aladdin M. Yaqub, and published by the University of Chicago Press in 2013.

References 

Books by Al-Ghazali
Books about Islam
Kalam
Sunni literature
Ash'ari literature
Sufi literature
Persian literature
Islamic theology books
Islamic belief and doctrine
12th-century books